Nick Ciola (born Dominic Ciola, sometimes called Caesar) is the bass guitarist for the Gear Daddies and (former Gear Daddies frontman) Martin Zellar and the Hardways.  He was born and raised in Austin, Minnesota.

References 

American bass guitarists
Guitarists from Minnesota
Living people
Year of birth missing (living people)